Yeongnam (영남) or Ryŏngnam is a region of Korea, whose name literally means "south of the passes".

Yeongnam may also refer to:

 Young-nam (영남, also Yeung-nam, Yeong-nam, Yong-nam), a Korean masculine given name
 Yeungnam High School, a school established in 1935 in Daegu, South Korea
 Yeungnam University, a private research university
 Youngnam Theological University and Seminary

See also

Lingnan (disambiguation)
 Yong-nam (용남), a Korean masculine given name